Ivana Večeřová (born 30 March 1979 in Šumperk, Czechoslovakia) is a Czech professional female basketball player. She is a center playing for Valosun Brno.

References

External links

 Player Profile at Eurobasket Women 2005
 Player Profile at Eurobasket Women 2007

1979 births
Living people
Czech women's basketball players
Olympic basketball players of the Czech Republic
Basketball players at the 2004 Summer Olympics
Basketball players at the 2008 Summer Olympics
Centers (basketball)
Galatasaray S.K. (women's basketball) players
People from Šumperk
Sportspeople from the Olomouc Region